(Jesus sleeps, what shall I hope for?), 81, is a church cantata by Johann Sebastian Bach. He composed it in 1724 in Leipzig for the fourth Sunday after Epiphany and first performed it on 30 January 1724.

History and words 
Bach wrote the cantata in his first year in Leipzig for the Fourth Sunday after Epiphany. A fourth Sunday after Epiphany is rare and occurs only in years with a late date of Easter. The prescribed readings for the Sunday were taken from the Epistle to the Romans, love completes the law, and from the Gospel of Matthew, Jesus calming the storm (after sleeping in the boat). The poet is unknown, but Erdmann Neumeister and Christian Weiss have been suggested by scholars. The words of movement 4 are a quote from the Gospel, the question of Jesus: "" (Why are ye fearful, O ye of little faith?). The closing chorale is the second stanza of Johann Franck's hymn "".

Bach first performed the cantata on 30 January 1724.

Scoring and structure 
The cantata in seven movements is scored for alto, tenor  and bass soloists, a four-part choir in the chorale, two oboes d'amore, two recorders, two violins, viola, and basso continuo. The recorders and the oboes were probably played by the same musicians.

 Aria (alto): 
 Recitative (tenor): 
 Aria (tenor): 
 Arioso (bass): 
 Aria (bass): 
 Recitative (alto): 
 Chorale:

Music 
The first aria speaks of the "sleeping", illustrated by the recorders, low registers of the strings, and long notes in the voice. Bach used similar means also in the aria  of his Easter Oratorio. The third movement almost visualizes the storm and the movement of the waves, similar to scenes in contemporary operas. The continuo and the voice use similar material in this arioso, intensifying the words. The following aria, marked allegro, contrasts the "storm", in unison runs of the strings, with calmer motion in the oboes.

The closing chorale is set for four parts. It is the second verse of "", a chorale by Johann Franck with a melody by Johann Crüger which appeared first in his  published in Berlin in 1653.

Selected recordings 

 Bach Cantatas Vol. 1 – Advent and Christmas, Karl Richter, Münchener Bach-Chor, Münchener Bach-Orchester, Anna Reynolds, Peter Schreier, Theo Adam, Archiv Produktion 1972
 J. S. Bach: Das Kantatenwerk – Sacred Cantatas Vol. 5, Nikolaus Harnoncourt, Tölzer Knabenchor, Concentus Musicus Wien, Paul Esswood, Kurt Equiluz, Ruud van der Meer, Teldec 1978
 Die Bach Kantate Vol. 25, Helmuth Rilling, Gächinger Kantorei, Bach-Collegium Stuttgart, Julia Hamari, Adalbert Kraus, Siegmund Nimsgern, Hänssler 1983
 J. S. Bach: Complete Cantatas Vol. 8, Ton Koopman, Amsterdam Baroque Orchestra & Choir, Bogna Bartosz, Jörg Dürmüller, Klaus Mertens, Antoine Marchand 1998
 J. S. Bach: Complete Cantatas Vol. 8, Pieter Jan Leusink, Holland Boys Choir, Netherlands Bach Collegium, Sytse Buwalda, Knut Schoch, Bas Ramselaar, Brilliant Classics 1999
 Bach Cantatas Vol. 19: Greenwich/Romsey, John Eliot Gardiner, Monteverdi Choir, English Baroque Soloists, William Towers, Paul Agnew, Peter Harvey, Soli Deo Gloria 2000
 J. S. Bach: Cantatas Vol. 21 – Cantatas from Leipzig 1724, Masaaki Suzuki, Bach Collegium Japan, Robin Blaze, James Gilchrist, Peter Kooy, BIS 2002
 J. S. Bach: Cantatas for the Complete Liturgical Year Vol. 8, Sigiswald Kuijken, La Petite Bande,  Gerlinde Sämann, Petra Noskaiová, Christoph Genz, Jan van der Crabben, Accent 2008

References

Sources 
 
 Jesus schläft, was soll ich hoffen BWV 81; BC A 39 / Sacred cantata (4th Sunday of Epiphany) Bach Digital
 Cantata BWV 81 Jesus schläft, was soll ich hoffen? history, scoring, sources for text and music, translations to various languages, discography, discussion, bach-cantatas website
 BWV 81 Jesus schläft, was soll ich hoffen? English translation, University of Vermont
 BWV 81 Jesus schläft, was soll ich hoffen? text, scoring, University of Alberta
 Luke Dahn: BWV 81.7 bach-chorales.com

External links 
 Jesus schläft, was soll ich hoffen? BWV 81: performance by the Netherlands Bach Society (video and background information)

Church cantatas by Johann Sebastian Bach
1724 compositions